Andrzej Pluta (born 26 April 1974) is a Polish retired basketball player and current coach. He played professionally in Poland and one season in France. His jersey number 10 was retired by Anwil Włocławek, where he played for six seasons.

External links
Profile on Polskikosz.pl

1974 births
Living people
Czarni Słupsk players
KK Włocławek players
Point guards
Polish basketball coaches
Polish men's basketball players
Turów Zgorzelec players
Asseco Gdynia players